Andrei Ivanavich Lavrik (born 7 December 1974) is a Belarusian football official, coach and a former player.

International goal

Honours
Dinamo-93 Minsk
Belarusian Cup winner: 1994–95

Dinamo Minsk
 Belarusian Premier League champion: 1997

Lokomotiv Moscow
 Russian Cup winner: 1999–2000, 2000–01

Aktobe
Kazakhstan Premier League champion: 2008, 2009
Kazakhstan Cup winner: 2008

External links

Living people
1974 births
Belarusian footballers
Belarusian expatriate footballers
Expatriate footballers in Kazakhstan
Expatriate footballers in Russia
Belarusian expatriate sportspeople in Russia
Belarusian expatriate sportspeople in Kazakhstan
Belarus international footballers
Belarusian Premier League players
Russian Premier League players
Kazakhstan Premier League players
FC Dinamo-93 Minsk players
FC Dinamo Minsk players
FC Lokomotiv Moscow players
FC Amkar Perm players
FC Torpedo Moscow players
FC Dynamo Saint Petersburg players
FC Aktobe players
FC Baltika Kaliningrad players
FC Torpedo-BelAZ Zhodino players
Association football defenders
FC Bereza-2010 managers
Footballers from Minsk